William Henry Keeler (March 4, 1931 – March 23, 2017) was an American cardinal of the Catholic Church. He served as Archbishop of Baltimore, Maryland, from 1989 to 2007 and was elevated to the College of Cardinals in 1994. He previously served as Auxiliary Bishop and Bishop of the Diocese of Harrisburg. Keeler was President of the United States Conference of Catholic Bishops from 1992 to 1995.

As Archbishop of Baltimore, Keeler led a restoration of the Basilica of the National Shrine of the Assumption of the Blessed Virgin Mary, one of two cathedrals in the archdiocese and the oldest in the United States, which was completely repaired and restored to near its original appearance by 2006. Keeler was also recognized for forming strong relationships with people from other religious groups, particularly those of the Jewish and Protestant faiths. He was also noted for his response to the sexual abuse crisis in the Catholic Church, choosing to publish the names of 57 priests who had been "credibly accused of child abuse" in 2002. In 2018, however, it was said he had not taken action against priests who had been accused of inappropriate conduct, significantly damaging his reputation.

Early life
Keeler was born in San Antonio, Texas, to Thomas Love and Margaret (née Conway) Keeler. He was of mixed Irish, Alsatian, and Scottish ancestry. Shortly afterward, the family moved to Lebanon, Pennsylvania, where Keeler attended St. Mary School and Lebanon Catholic High School. Keeler was one of five children. Keeler's mother was a schoolteacher and the daughter of an Illinois farmer. She married his father, a steel-casting salesman, in 1930. Keeler was a member of the Boy Scouts of America and achieved the rank of Eagle Scout. Keeler received a BA from St. Charles Borromeo Seminary in Wynnewood, Pennsylvania, in 1952.

While studying at the Pontifical Gregorian University in Rome, he was ordained to the priesthood on July 17, 1955 by Archbishop Luigi Traglia.

He received both a Licentiate of Sacred Theology (1956) and Doctorate of Canon Law (1961) from the Gregorian, and after doing pastoral and curial work in the Diocese of Harrisburg, he served as a peritus, or expert, and secretary to Bishop George Leech at the Second Vatican Council (1962–1965). He attended all four sessions. Keeler worked for the Council Digest, a communications service used to bring people in the United States day-to day news of the Council.

Early episcopal career
On July 24, 1979, Keeler was appointed Auxiliary Bishop of Harrisburg and Titular Bishop of Ulcinium. He received his episcopal consecration on September 21 from Bishop Joseph Thomas Daley, with Bishops Francis Gossman and Martin Lohmuller serving as co-consecrators. Keeler took as his episcopal motto: Opus Fac Evangelistae ("Do the Work of an Evangelist").

Keeler was named the seventh Bishop of Harrisburg on November 10, 1983, succeeding Bishop Daley, who had died. He was installed on January 4, 1984 in the Cathedral of St. Patrick. As Bishop of Harrisburg, Keeler served on a number of committees for interreligious dialogue, and helped expand diocesan youth ministry.

Archbishop of Baltimore

Early years and extra-diocesan activities
Keeler was appointed as the fourteenth Archbishop of Baltimore on April 11, 1989, following the retirement of William Donald Borders, and was installed on May 23. As Archbishop of Baltimore, Keeler was head of America's oldest apostolic see.

He was elected President of the United States Conference of Catholic Bishops (USCCB) in November 1992 for a term ending in 1995.

Keeler was created Cardinal-Priest of Santa Maria degli Angeli e dei Martiri by Pope John Paul II in a consistory on November 26, 1994.

While president of the United States Conference of Catholic Bishops, Keeler helped to organize the 1993 World Youth Day held in Denver, Colorado. He helped facilitate Pope John Paul II's 1995 visit to Baltimore. Shortly before the Pope's visit to Baltimore, Bill Broadway of The Washington Post called Keeler "one of the most respected Catholic leaders in the United States."

In 1994 John Paul II named Keeler a member of both the Pontifical Council for Promoting Christian Unity and the Congregation for the Oriental Churches. From 1998 to 2001 and again from late 2003 to 2006, he served as Chair for the Committee on Pro-Life Activities. Keeler participated in the 2005 conclave that elected Joseph Ratzinger as Pope Benedict XVI.

Keeler served in numerous positions in other organizations, including as the President of the American Division Catholic Near East Welfare Association. He was the chair of the Black and Native American Missions Board and the chair of Catholic Charities. Keeler was also president of the Cathedral Foundation and publisher of archdiocese's newspaper, The Catholic Review.

Sexual abuse scandal

Keeler faced sharp criticism for his handling of accusations of sexual abuse against the Rev. Maurice J. Blackwell, who was accused by Dontee D. Stokes of sexual abuse in 1993 and who was later shot by Stokes. Keeler first suspended the priest but later reinstated him as pastor of St. Edward in Baltimore, overruling a lay panel that had recommended against reinstatement.

When The Boston Globe "Spotlight" in-depth reporting in 2002 began breaking the sexual abuse scandal in the Archdiocese of Boston, Keeler's first response was to resist the media "feeding frenzy." Several cardinals had already spoken publicly about the issue before Keeler chose to do so. Richard Sipe, a former priest and psychotherapist living in Baltimore, was one of the first to bring the issue of sexually abusive Catholic priests to public attention. He said that Keeler was "probably one of the most politically savvy of all the cardinals in the country. He plays things safe and is very concerned about avoiding any scandal."

Keeler, however, became the first bishop to identify publicly priests who had been "credibly accused of child abuse," listing 57 on the archdiocese website and detailing $5.6 million spent on settlements, legal fees and counseling. Keeler called for addressing the scandal "with humble contrition, righteous anger and public outrage. Telling the truth cannot be wrong." While victims and their advocates praised him and other bishops followed his lead, "defenders of the church criticized him and the other bishops as having betrayed the priests in their dioceses," according to The New York Times. '"I think Cardinal Keeler has taken a very bold and courageous and pastorally sensitive approach," said Bishop Wilton Daniel Gregory, President of the USCCB, at the time.

In 2002, Stokes was accused of shooting and wounding Blackwell, his alleged abuser. Keeler testified for the defendant in his trial that year. Stokes was acquitted of the felony.

On August 1, 2018, the Bishop of Harrisburg, Ronald William Gainer, announced that the names of every bishop of Harrisburg from 1947 onward—including Keeler's -- would be removed from any building or room in the diocese named in their honor, due to their failure to protect victims from abuse. On August 14, the Pennsylvania Supreme Court released a report alleging the coverup of sexual abuse in six dioceses, including Keeler's dating back to when he served as Bishop of Harrisburg. The Archdiocese of Baltimore immediately cancelled plans to name a new pre K-8 Baltimore Catholic school scheduled to be opened in 2020 after Keeler due to his ties with Father Arthur Long, a sexually abusive Harrisburg priest who was transferred to the Archdiocese of Baltimore after Keeler was named Archbishop.

The grand jury report accused Keeler of committing criminal inaction during his time as Bishop of Harrisburg. Keeler was first notified of allegations of sexual abuse against Long in 1987. A church memo written in 1995, the year Long was removed from ministry, revealed that accusations of "inappropriate behavior" had surfaced against Long in 1991 and 1992 during his time in the Archdiocese of Baltimore.

Basilica restoration
Keeler was responsible for the restoration of Baltimore's Basilica of the National Shrine of the Assumption of the Blessed Virgin Mary, America's first cathedral. The project cost approximately $32 million. The funds were raised entirely from private donations and not from the Archdiocese's treasury. It lasted from 2004 until November 2006, and was finished in time for a celebration honoring the 200th anniversary of the groundbreaking. By the time the restoration was completed, the Basilica had been repaired and restored to its more original appearance.

Resignation
In April 2006, Keeler, after reaching his 75th year of age, submitted his resignation to the Pope as required by Church law. It was accepted by Pope Benedict XVI on July 12, 2007. Keeler was succeeded by Edwin Frederick O'Brien, who until then had served as Archbishop of the Roman Catholic Archdiocese for the Military Services, USA.

Honors and awards

A Distinguished Eagle Scout, Keeler was a recipient of the Silver Beaver, Silver Antelope, and Silver Buffalo of the Boy Scouts of America.

He held honorary degrees from Lebanon Valley College, Gettysburg College, Susquehanna University, and Gannon University.

Teachings

Life issues
As chairman of the U.S. Bishops' Committee for Pro-life Activities, Keeler criticized Senate Majority Leader Bill Frist's 2005 announcement that he will support federally funded stem cell research that requires destroying human embryos. He mourned the death of Terri Schiavo, calling it a "human tragedy." Schiavo was a woman in a persistent vegetative state who died in 2005, thirteen days after her feeding tube had been removed at the request of her husband. The Baltimore Sun called him "a leading national voice" against abortion.

Ecumenism and interreligious dialogue
Keeler was known for his commitment to ecumenism and interreligious dialogue. When Pope John Paul II visited the United States in 1987, Keeler helped arrange his meetings with Jewish leaders in Miami, Florida and Protestant leaders in Columbia, South Carolina. The meeting with the Jews took place after they threatened to boycott the meeting after the Pope met with former U.N. General Secretary Kurt Waldheim, whom, as it had recently been revealed, had previous connections to Nazi Germany. After Keeler intervened, the Jewish leaders agreed to attend the meeting. On November 18, 2005, at the annual general assembly of the National Council of Churches, he reassured delegates that the Catholic Church, and Pope Benedict XVI, were firmly ecumenical.

Death
On March 23, 2017, Keeler died at age 86 in his residence at St. Martin's Home for the Aged, run by the Little Sisters of the Poor, in Catonsville, Maryland. He had been ill for several years.

See also

 Catholic Church hierarchy
 Catholic Church in the United States
 Historical list of the Catholic bishops of the United States
 List of Catholic bishops of the United States
 Lists of patriarchs, archbishops, and bishops

References

External links

 Archdiocese of Baltimore
 Basilica of the National Shrine of the Assumption of the Blessed Virgin Mary
 Cathedral of Mary Our Queen
 The Coat of Arms of Cardinal William H. Keeler
 

1931 births
2017 deaths
21st-century American cardinals
Roman Catholic archbishops of Baltimore
20th-century American cardinals
Roman Catholic bishops of Harrisburg
Cardinals created by Pope John Paul II
Grand Priors of the Order of the Holy Sepulchre
People from San Antonio
St. Charles Borromeo Seminary alumni
Elizabethtown College alumni
Participants in the Second Vatican Council
Catholic Church sexual abuse scandals in the United States
Catholics from Texas
Ecclesiastical passivity to Catholic sexual abuse cases